Mark Valenti is an Emmy-nominated American writer known for movies, TV series and novels.

Career biography 
Valenti began his entertainment career as an actor with the St. Louis theatrical troupe, The City Players. Moving to Los Angeles, he studied at the Lee Strasberg Theatre Institute under Sally Kirkland and Marc Marno. During this period, Valenti appeared in several LA stage productions, and took roles on sitcoms and soap operas, including NBC's The Facts of Life.

In 1986, Valenti became a production assistant for Steven Spielberg's Amblin Entertainment. Spielberg had initiated a program whereby assistants would be given an opportunity to learn as much a possible in two years, identify a career path, and then move into their chosen field. Valenti segued into a role as Vice President of Development for John Hughes. During his three-year tenure, Hughes produced ten films, including Home Alone, National Lampoon's Christmas Vacation, Planes, Trains and Automobiles, and Uncle Buck.

Having been intimately involved in Hughes' screenwriting process, Valenti left the executive ranks and began writing film scripts himself. His first produced movie, Menno's Mind, starring Billy Campbell and Robert Vaughn, was seen on the Showtime channel. The script was based on a short story he had written as a high school senior. This was followed by a flurry of screenplay spec sales to DreamWorks (Planet Fred), Nickelodeon Movies (Bob the House), ABC Family (Like Father, Like Santa), Hallmark (The Christmas Pageant), and many more.

Valenti was Creative Manager for a team tasked with re-imagining Disney's California Adventures theme park in Anaheim. He also served as Creative Manager for Disney Interactive.

In 1999, Valenti was recruited as Story Editor at Nickelodeon Studios, working with the writing staff of shows like Rugrats, Hey Arnold!, CatDog, Angry Beavers, and Rocket Power.

In 2000, Valenti was awarded a Platinum record for writing the spoken-word portion of Mannheim Steamroller's "The Christmas Angel," signifying over one million units sold.

By 2003, he was back in the role of screenwriter, becoming Head Writer for the Nickelodeon TV show LazyTown. Shot in Iceland on a sound stage in the middle of a lava field, LazyTown debuted as the #1 show for Nickelodeon, and went on to produce more than 75 episodes, seen around the globe. Valenti also wrote and co-wrote lyrics for many of LazyTown's popular songs. 

In 2022, Mark Valenti was nominated for an Emmy award for STEM Explorers, a PBS show aimed at bringing science concepts to young viewers.

Books 
In 1995, Valenti published "The Wonderful Wisdom of Oz - A Stupendous Compendium of Adages, Aphorisms and Axioms," a collection of curated quotes derived from the work of Oz author L. Frank Baum. His next book was "The Hannibal Twist" featuring a now-adult Tom Sawyer and Huck Finn in their continuing adventures. In 2004, he wrote Mannheim Steamroller's "The Christmas Angel," a novelization of the NBC Christmas special of the same name. 2010 saw the publication of the coming-of-age dark comedy, "Last Night at the Monarch Motel," which was optioned by a film production company.

In 2018, Valenti wrote the YA novel trilogy, "The Wolf and the Warlander," published by Chip Davis' American Gramophone. It captures the incredible adventures of two unlikely friends – Seti the wolf and Ghost the Warlander horse. Brought together by unusual circumstances, these natural enemies grow up alongside one another, facing the challenges that arise from their opposing instincts. Somehow, through the hardships of life in the wild and vicious attacks by predators, they forge an unforgettable, inspirational alliance.

Charitable works 
In 1992, Valenti and his wife Kristen created a fundraiser, "Heart of the Matter," held at Pasadena's Ambassador Auditorium, for their friend Barbie York, then-wife of acclaimed classical guitarist Andrew York. Barbie had suffered a severe head injury in an automobile accident, sending her into a months-long coma. The concert they produced was a once-in-a-lifetime gathering of the classical guitar world's greatest players, among them Christopher Parkening, the LA Guitar Quartet, Leona Boyd and The Romeros. The concert netted $25,000 in one night.

In 2016, Valenti's friend and colleague Stefan Karl, who played the villain Robbie Rotten on LazyTown, was diagnosed with Cholangiocarcinoma. Stefan was forced to cancel all work-related activities during his treatment, so Valenti created at GoFundMe campaign which eventually raised nearly $170,000. Valenti also engineered an AMA on Reddit, featuring Stefan - with the help of his wife Steinunn Olina - which led to a live YouTube event in December of that year. The video featured Stefan and others singing "We Are Number One," the song (written by composer Mani Svavarsson) that had become a worldwide meme. The video has subsequently been seen millions of times, and Stefan's YouTube channel has generated more than a million subscribers.

Credits

Professional affiliations 
Mark Valenti is a member of The Writers Guild of America and The Academy of Television Arts & Sciences.

References

Living people
American television writers
American male television writers
Date of birth missing (living people)
Year of birth missing (living people)